HMS Keats (K482) was a British Captain-class frigate of the Royal Navy in commission during World War II. Originally constructed as the United States Navy Evarts-class destroyer escort USS Tisdale (DE-278), she served in the Royal Navy from 1943 to 1946.

Construction and transfer
The ship was ordered on 25 January 1942 and laid down by the Boston Navy Yard in Boston, Massachusetts, on 5 June 1943 as the U.S. Navy destroyer escort USS Tisdale (DE-278), the first ship of the name in honour of Commander Ryland Dillard Tisdale (1894-1942) who had been killed in action during combat with the Moros on Mindanao on 23 May 1942. She was launched on 17 July 1943. The United States transferred the ship to the United Kingdom under Lend-Lease on 19 October 1943.

Service history
The ship was commissioned into service in the Royal Navy as HMS Keats (K482) named in honour of Admiral Richard Goodwin Keats (who served in the Royal Navy during the American Revolution, French Revolution and Napoleonic wars, before being appointed Governor of the Royal Hospital Greenwich) 19 October 1943  simultaneously with her transfer. She served on patrol and escort duty.

On 15 April 1945, she joined the British frigate  in a depth-charge attack that sank the German submarine  in the North Atlantic Ocean southwest of Ireland at position .

The Royal Navy returned Keats to the U.S. Navy on 27 February 1946.

Disposal
The U.S. Navy struck Keats from its Naval Vessel Register on 20 March 1946 and sold her on 19 November 1946 to George H. Nutman, Inc., of Brooklyn, New York, for scrapping.

Note
For a biography of Admiral Sir Richard Goodwin Keats G.C.B. see; Hannah, P., A Treasure to the Service, Green Hill, Adelaide, 2021, ISBN 978-1-922629-73-9

References

 

Captain-class frigates
Evarts-class destroyer escorts
World War II frigates of the United Kingdom
World War II frigates and destroyer escorts of the United States
Ships built in Boston
1943 ships